"Everything" is a song recorded by Canadian singer Michael Bublé, and released on April 23, 2007, as the lead single from his fifth studio album, Call Me Irresponsible.

Background
Bublé wrote the lyrics of "Everything" for his then girlfriend Emily Blunt. He later explained: "I wrote the song about the great happiness of real love, but at the same time I was making a statement about the world. We're living in really crazy times, and I wanted to say that no matter what's happening, this person in my life is what really makes it worthwhile." Unlike Bublé's other work, this song strays away from being big band oriented, carrying some elements of pop and rock. It is completely devoid of a horn section, as well as being guitar driven. A piano and an acoustic guitar carry the main melody of the song, with electric guitars audible in the chorus. Bublé's vocal arrangement is also different from his previous material; his voice often makes big interval changes in most of his material, but his voice in this particular song is projected smoothly without going into loud intervals. It is comparable to his previous hit single, "Home", from the album It's Time.

The music video for the song features scenes of Bublé performing the song into a mic, as well as holding an open audition for actors and entertainers to appear in the video, finally choosing the right candidate at the end. In Italy, the song topped the digital singles chart in April 2007, before reaching the top of the overall singles chart over a year later in June 2008. Bono and Whoopi Goldberg make cameo appearances for auditions in the video.

Track listings
 UK CD single 1 and 7-inch vinyl
 "Everything" (Album Version) - 3:36
 "Home" (American Remix) - 4:04

 UK CD single 2
 "Everything" (Album Version) - 3:36
 "These Foolish Things (Remind Me of You)" - 4:48
 "Everything" (Alternative Mix) - 3:30

Chart performance

Weekly charts

Year-end charts

Certifications

See also
List of Billboard Adult Contemporary number ones of 2007
List of number-one digital songs of 2007 (Italy)
List of number-one hits of 2008 (Italy)

References

2007 singles
Michael Bublé songs
Number-one singles in Italy
Songs written by Alan Chang
Songs written by Michael Bublé
143 Records singles
Reprise Records singles
Songs written by Amy S. Foster
2006 songs